The 1990–91 season was Manchester City's second consecutive season in the top tier of English football, the Football League First Division.

Season summary
Howard Kendall built a strong Manchester City side that spent the first few months of the season near the top of the table, but left in November, with City in fifth, to return to Everton, justifying his move by claiming that Manchester City was his affair but Everton was his marriage. Midfielder Peter Reid was named as caretaker before being appointed permanent City manager; he led the Mancunians to fifth place. Andy Hill became Peter Reid's first major signing as a manager paying Bury £200,000 for his capture.

Irish striker Niall Quinn was City's top scorer with 21 goals in all competitions. He was named the club's Player of the Year.

Football League First Division

League table

Results summary

Results

FA Cup

League Cup

Full Members' Cup

Kit
City's kit was manufactured by English company Umbro and sponsored by Japanese electronics manufacturer Brother.

Squad
Squad at end of season

Left club during season

Transfers

Out
 Andy Hinchcliffe - Everton
 Mark Seagraves - Bolton Wanderers

In
 Andy Hill - Bury

References

Manchester City F.C. seasons
Manchester City